John Sutherland (3 August 1904 – 21 June 1955) was  a former Australian rules footballer who played with Footscray in the Victorian Football League (VFL).

Notes

External links 
		

1904 births
1955 deaths
Australian rules footballers from Victoria (Australia)
Western Bulldogs players
Nathalia Football Club players